Namyang Workers' District (남양로동자구) is a town in Onsong, North Hamgyong, North Korea. It lies on the Tumen River and opposite to the city of Tumen that stands in the Chinese bank of the river.

Transportation

Most of the movement in the town is made by trucks and bicycles. The town is also served by Namyang Station on the Hambuk Line of the Korean State Railway. A road and a railroad bridge connect Namyang to Tumen across the river in China. Google Earth images show a new, larger bridge under construction as of September 2018.

See also

 Tumen Border Bridge

Sources

External links
 360 degree panorama of Namyang

Neighbourhoods in North Korea
China–North Korea border crossings
Onsong